Belalie is the common name for Acacia stenophylla

Belalie  may also refer to the following places in South Australia:

District Council of Belalie
Belalie East, South Australia
Hundred of Belalie